Fernando René Cárdenas Villafaña (born 20 March 1975), also known as Fernando Rene in Indonesia, is a Chilean former professional footballer who played as a midfielder for clubs in Chile and Indonesia.

Career
Cárdenas is better known by his career in Coquimbo Unido in the Chilean Primera División from 1994 to 1998 and 2001.

In Chile, he also played for Palestino (1999) and Unión Española (2000) in the top division.

Abroad, he played in Indonesia for clubs such as Perseden Denpasar (2005) and Persim Maros (2006), where also played his compatriot Cristian Carrasco and scored eight goals.

Personal life
He lived in Bali, Indonesia, for nine years.

His mother, Lucía Villafaña, was honored as an important fan of Coquimbo Unido.

References

External links
 Fernando Cárdenas at playmakerstats.com (English version of ceroacero.es)
 

1975 births
Living people
People from Coquimbo
Chilean footballers
Chilean expatriate footballers
Coquimbo Unido footballers
Club Deportivo Palestino footballers
Unión Española footballers
Perseden Denpasar players
Persim Maros players
Chilean Primera División players
Chilean expatriate sportspeople in Indonesia
Expatriate footballers in Indonesia
Association football midfielders